Tricolia entomocheila is a species of sea snail, a marine gastropod mollusk in the family Phasianellidae.

Description
The height of the shell reaches 2 mm.

Distribution
This species occurs in the Western Mediterranean Sea and off Atlantic Morocco.

References

 http://www.vliz.be/imisdocs/publications/ocrd/254404.pdf Gofas, S.; Le Renard, J.; Bouchet, P. (2001). Mollusca. in: Costello, M.J. et al. (eds), European Register of Marine Species: a check-list of the marine species in Europe and a bibliography of guides to their identification. Patrimoines Naturels. 50: 180-213]

External links
 

Phasianellidae
Gastropods described in 1993